Compsaraia is a genus of ghost knifefishes found in tropical South America.  There are currently three described species in this genus. They are found deep in large rivers in the Amazon and Orinoco basins, and have small eyes and little pigment (appearing whitish in colour).

Species
There are three species:

 Compsaraia compsa (Mago-Leccia, 1994)
 Compsaraia iara Bernt & Albert, 2017
 Compsaraia samueli Albert & Crampton, 2009

References

Apteronotidae
Fish of South America
Freshwater fish genera
Taxa named by James S. Albert